Real Dreams is an Egyptian thriller film produced in 2007 starring Hanan Tork, Khaled Saleh. The protagonist, Mariam, is living a troubled life with her husband Ahmed. Suddenly, her life turns upside down when she starts having dreams of crimes that she discovers real on the next morning. Thinking she's the one who commits them while sleeping, she decides to stay awake.

Cast 
 Hanan Tork - Mariam
 Khaled Saleh  		
 Dalia El Behairy 
 Fathy abdel wahab

References

External links
 

2007 films
2000s Arabic-language films
Egyptian horror films